The Physician Payments Sunshine Act is a 2010 United States healthcare law to increase transparency of financial relationships between health care providers and pharmaceutical manufacturers.

About
The Sunshine Act requires manufacturers of drugs, medical devices, biological and medical supplies covered by the three federal health care programs Medicare, Medicaid, and State Children's Health Insurance Program (SCHIP) to collect and track all financial relationships with physicians and teaching hospitals and to report these data to the Centers for Medicare and Medicaid Services (CMS). The goal of the law is to increase the transparency of financial relationships between health care providers and pharmaceutical manufacturers and to uncover potential conflicts of interest. The bill allows states to enact "additional requirements", as six states already had industry-pay disclosure laws.

In 2013, the American Medical Association offered physicians training to understand the Sunshine Act.

History
The Sunshine Act was first introduced in 2007 by senior US Senator Charles Grassley, a Republican from Iowa and Senator Herb Kohl from Wisconsin, a member of the Democratic Party. The act was introduced independently and failed. After debate by various groups  it was enacted along with the 2010 Patient Protection and Affordable Care Act.

In 2011, it was proposed to use identification systems on tracked physicians.

On September 30, 2014, the Centers for Medicare and Medicaid Services reported payment information on its Open Payment Program website for the first time, the data from 2012.

Criticism
In 2012 it was suggested that the act may have a limited effect on prescribing and on expenditures.

A 2015 opinion piece in JAMA stated that the value of transparency was beyond dispute, but "the true value of the database remains uncertain and probably too early to ascertain".

International comparison
There is no agreement on appropriate standards of disclosure internationally.

Australia  was one of the first countries that has, since mid-2007, required reporting of details of every industry-sponsored event. Data are publicly posted, updated every six months and downloadable as pdf only. A 2009 study found modest expenditure at individual events, but high cumulatively, particularly for prescribers of high cost drugs like oncologists, endocrinologists, and cardiologists. It concluded disclosure requirements fell short of what is required and proposed more comprehensive data collections.

The effectiveness of this register will be evaluated in 2019.

References

External links

Affordable Care Act
Proposed legislation of the 111th United States Congress
United States federal health legislation